Albert Kawana (born 26 March 1956) is a Namibian politician. A member of SWAPO, Kawana has been a member of the National Assembly and cabinet since 2000, serving in various positions. Since April 2021 he is minister of Home Affairs, Immigration, Safety and Security. A lawyer by training, Kawana led Namibia's legal team in the Kasikili Island dispute, which was argued before the International Court of Justice.

Early life and education
Kawana was born on 26 March 1956 at Katima Mulilo in the Zambezi Region. He entered Namibian politics while in exile in Zambia. In 1979 he graduated from the United Nations Institute for Namibia (UNIN) with a diploma in Development Studies and Management. He moved onto the University of Warwick in the United Kingdom, where he received his L.L.M. in 1983 and Ph.D. in 1988. Following graduation, Kawana moved back to Zambia, where he became a lecturer in the final years of UNIN from 1988 to 1990.

Career
Following Namibia's independence in March 1990, Kawana moved back to Namibia to become the first permanent secretary in the Minister of Justice, where he worked until 2000. Chosen by SWAPO to the third National Assembly in 2000, he immediately was promoted to the position of deputy Minister of Justice. Following the 2004 general election, Kawana was promoted to head the justice ministry, becoming the first permanent secretary to advance to the top post of minister since independence.

Kawana led Namibia's legal team in the Kasikili Island dispute, which was argued before the International Court of Justice. The court eventually sided with Botswana.

In 2005 he became minister for presidential affairs, serving until 2015. Kawana was also included in president Hage Geingob's cabinet, appointed in March 2015, as minister of justice. During a cabinet reshuffle in February 2018 he swapped positions with Sacky Shanghala and became attorney general, also in the rank of a minister. Kawana became Minister of Fisheries and Marine Resources after the 2019 election. In a cabinet reshuffle in April 2021 he was moved to the Home Affairs, Immigration, Safety and Security ministry.

References

1956 births
Living people
People from Katima Mulilo
Members of the National Assembly (Namibia)
Alumni of the University of Warwick
Namibian expatriates in the United Kingdom
Namibian expatriates in Zambia
SWAPO politicians
Justice ministers of Namibia
Attorneys-General of Namibia
Fisheries ministers of Namibia
Home affairs ministers of Namibia